Plymouth Sutton and Devonport is a constituency created in 2010, and represented in the House of Commons of the UK Parliament since 2017 by Luke Pollard, a Labour Co-operative party candidate.

The seat is one of two won (held or gained) by a Labour candidate in 2017 from a total of twelve in its county. Pollard's 2017 win was one of 30 net gains for the Labour Party. The seat was in 2010 and 2015 a very marginal win for Oliver Colvile, his greatest majority being 2.6%.

Constituency profile
The constituency covers the south of the city including HMNB Devonport, and has a large student population attending the University of Plymouth.

Boundaries

The seat is a borough constituency (for the purposes of type of returning officer and election expenses). As with all current constituencies it elects one Member of Parliament (MP) by the first past the post system.

The areas which make up this seat include Compton, Devonport, Stonehouse, Drake ward (which includes the University and Mutley), Efford and Lipson, Peverell, St Peter and the Waterfront, Stoke, and Sutton and Mount Gould.

The constituency is entirely within the boundaries of the City of Plymouth, and includes the city centre.

History
History of boundaries
The 2007 review by the Boundary Commission for England recommended the creation of this seat and Plymouth Moor View, which was duly approved by Parliament. It is largely based on the former Plymouth Sutton. To this is added smaller parts of the former Plymouth Devonport seat.

History of results

This constituency was won on creation in 2010 by a Conservative, Oliver Colvile. In 2015, against opinion polls for losing, Colvile held it (but narrowly) over the Labour candidate Luke Pollard. The 2015 result gave the seat the 7th most marginal majority of the Conservative Party's 331 seats by percentage of majority.

In 2017, Pollard defeated Colvile to gain the seat with a majority of 6,807; originally, the majority was declared as 6,002, but a spreadsheet error meant the votes from the Efford and Lipson ward were not included in the declaration on the night of the count. Additionally about 35,000 postal voters received two polling cards, causing confusion, and some postal votes were not sent out.

Members of Parliament

Elections

Elections in the 2010s

See also
List of parliamentary constituencies in Devon

References

Sources
Plymouth Sutton and Devonport, UKPollingReport

Parliamentary constituencies in Devon
Politics of Plymouth, Devon
Constituencies of the Parliament of the United Kingdom established in 2010